Retrofit EP is the fifth EP by Spahn Ranch, released on March 3, 1998 by Cleopatra Records.

Reception

Jon Worley of Aiding & Abetting commended Retrofit EP for packaging remixes that sound different from their original source. AllMusic critic Mike Pfeiffer gave the gave two and a half out of five stars and said "it's arguably Spahn Ranch's most dance-oriented effort yet." Sonic Boom called the album "a fine collection of Trance, Dub, Drum'n'Bass, and Jungle mixes of classic Spahn Ranch tunes."

Track listing

Personnel
Adapted from the Retrofit EP liner notes.

Spahn Ranch
 Matt Green – sampler, keyboards, production and mixing (8)
 Harry Lewis – percussion
 Athan Maroulis – lead vocals

Additional performers
 David Parkinson (as David Glass) – percussion (8)

Production and design
 T.J. Barrial – photography
 Atelier³ D Thom Bissett – design
 Eric Fahlborg – mastering

Release history

References

External links 
 Retrofit at iTunes
 

1998 EPs
Remix EPs
Spahn Ranch (band) albums
Cleopatra Records EPs